The Gerhard Herzberg Canada Gold Medal for Science and Engineering is awarded by the Natural Sciences and Engineering Research Council (NSERC) of Canada to recognize "research contributions characterized by both excellence and  influence."  Prior to 2000, NSERC had awarded the Canada Gold Medal for Science and Engineering, before deciding to rename the award to honour Gerhard Herzberg, winner of the 1971 Nobel Prize in Chemistry.

The Herzberg medal is commonly called Canada's top award for science and engineering.  It is an individual annual award that recognizes continued excellence and influence in research in either natural sciences or engineering.  The award is a gold medal, and the guarantee of $1 million over five years to use for personal research.

About the award
NSERC's Canada Gold Medal for Science and Engineering was first awarded in 1991 to Raymond Lemieux, a chemist working at University of Alberta.  Mathematician James Arthur from the University of Toronto was the 1999 recipient, the last year before the award was renamed in honour of Gerhard Herzberg, the winner of the 1971 Nobel Prize in Chemistry.  NSERC decided to rename the award after Herzberg because they felt he embodied the two main qualities of the award, namely research contributions that are of high quality and influential.

The Herzberg medal is awarded to a scientist or engineer working at a facility in Canada.  It is considered Canada's top award for science and engineering.  Eligible facilities include universities, government and private labs.  Nominations can be submitted by any Canadian citizen or permanent resident.  The winner is chosen by a selection committee representing different scientific disciplines, who make a recommendations to the current NSERC president.  The award consists of a gold medal, and the guarantee of at least $1 million to use for research or for establishing research chairs, fellowships or scholarships in the recipients' name.

Recipients

Award of Excellence
From 2002 until 2009, three finalists were selected for the Herzberg Medal, and the winner selected from among them.  The other two finalists (if it was their first time as a finalist) were awarded NSERC's Award of Excellence.

See also
Canadian Association of Physicists#CAP Herzberg Medal

References

Science and technology awards
Awards established in 1993